Duesenberg was an automobile manufacturer active from 1913 to 1937. Duesenberg may also refer to:

 August Duesenberg, German-American automobile manufacturer
 Fred Duesenberg, German-American automobile manufacturer
 Duesenberg Guitars, a German company producing electric guitars and basses

See also
 Duisenberg
 Duesberg (disambiguation)